Goniodoris violacea is a species of sea slug, a dorid nudibranch, a marine gastropod mollusc in the family Goniodorididae.

Distribution
This species was first described from New Caledonia. It has not been found elsewhere.

Description
This goniodorid nudibranch is translucent violet in colour, with a dark violet edge along the pallial margin.

Ecology
Goniodoris violacea probably feeds on bryozoans or colonial ascidians but the diet is apparently not yet determined.

References

Goniodorididae
Gastropods described in 1928